Kateh Mian (also Romanized as Kateh Mīān; also known as Kat-e Mīān) is a village in Sarpaniran Rural District, in the Central District of Pasargad County, Fars Province, Iran. At the 2006 census, its population was 131, in 28 families.

References 

Populated places in Pasargad County